Janikowice may refer to the following places:
Janikowice, Kraków County in Lesser Poland Voivodeship (south Poland)
Janikowice, Tarnów County in Lesser Poland Voivodeship (south Poland)
Janikowice, Łódź Voivodeship (central Poland)